Estonia was represented by Tanel Padar, Dave Benton and 2XL, with the song '"Everybody", at the 2001 Eurovision Song Contest, which took place on 12 May in Copenhagen. "Everybody" was chosen as the Estonian entry at the national final, Eurolaul, on 3 February.

"Everybody" went on to bring Estonia one of the most unexpected victories in Eurovision history. It is also historic for representing the first Eurovision victory by one of the "new" nations – the considerable number of countries which had joined Eurovision post-1992 – and also for Benton becoming the first (and to date only) black performer to win a Eurovision title.

Before Eurovision

Eurolaul 2001 
The final was held at the studios of broadcaster ETV in Tallinn, hosted by Marko Reikop and Elektra. Eight songs took part with the winner being chosen by an "expert" international jury.  All songs were presented in English for the first time.

At Eurovision 
On the night of the final Padar, Benton and 2XL performed 20th in the running order, following Germany and preceding Malta. Pre-contest betting had rated Greece as the favourite for victory, with Denmark, France, Slovenia and Sweden also in the frame and Estonia nowhere in sight. The first half of the voting was very tight, and after 12 countries Denmark was in the lead on 99 points, with Estonia and France on 92 and 90 respectively. However, from that point Estonia quickly pulled away and at the close of voting "Everybody" had received 198 points and become a very surprising winner by a clear margin of 21 points over eventual runners-up Denmark. The song had received nine maximum 12s – from Greece, Latvia, Lithuania, Malta, the Netherlands, Poland, Slovenia, Turkey and the United Kingdom – with only one country (Portugal) failing to award it any points at all. The 12 points from the Estonian televote were awarded to Denmark.

Voting

References 

2001
Countries in the Eurovision Song Contest 2001
Eurovision